The Purity of Vengeance (Journal 64) is the soundtrack to the 2018 Christoffer Boe film of the same name. The score was composed by Mikkel Maltha & Anthony Lledo and released in 2018 on MovieScore Media. The score was nominated for a Danish Film Academy Award.

Track listing
Music composed by Mikkel Maltha & Anthony Lledo.

Credits
 Anthony Lledo - Composer
 Mikkel Maltha - Composer
 Joris Bartsch Buhle - Conductor
 Orchestra - Berlin Session Strings
 Studio - Teldex Studio Berlin
 Peter Due - Orchestration
 Anthony Lledo - Orchestration
 Tobias Lehmann - Recording Producer
 Cornelius Dürst - Recording engineer
 John Rodd - Album Mastering
 Mikael Carlsson - Album Producer

References

2018 soundtrack albums
2010s film soundtrack albums